The GHI Bronx Tennis Classic was a tennis tournament for male professional players played on hard courts. The event was held annually in the Bronx, New York, as part of the ATP Challenger Series.

Egyptian tennis player Tamer El-Sawy detain the record for victories, having won two singles titles.

Past finals

Singles

Doubles

See also
List of tennis tournaments

References 
Official website
ITF search 

Defunct tennis tournaments in the United States
Hard court tennis tournaments in the United States
ATP Challenger Tour
Recurring sporting events established in 1993
Sports in the Bronx
1993 establishments in New York City
2008 disestablishments in New York (state)
Recurring sporting events established in 2008